Lamjaara is a small town and rural commune in Ouezzane Province of the Tanger-Tetouan-Al Hoceima region of Morocco. At the time of the 2004 census, the commune had a total population of 16,899 people living in 3053 households.

See also
Ajellidine

References

Populated places in Ouezzane Province
Rural communes of Tanger-Tetouan-Al Hoceima